American singer and songwriter Madonna has recorded songs for fourteen studio albums, four compilation albums, three soundtrack albums, five live albums and two remix albums. She has provided background vocals for songs recorded by other artists, as well as being featured on other artists' tracks.

After being associated with music bands like Breakfast Club and Emmy, Madonna signed with Sire Records (an auxiliary label of Warner Bros. Records) in 1982 and released her self-titled debut album the following year. She is the sole writer of most of the songs on the album. Madonna was followed by Like a Virgin (1984) and True Blue (1986). From then on she released a series of successful albums, including the Grammy Award winners Ray of Light (1998) and Confessions on a Dance Floor (2005). Madonna has collaborated with a number of songwriters throughout her career, with many of the songs reaching number one on the record charts around the world, including "Like a Virgin", "La Isla Bonita", "Like a Prayer", "Vogue", "Take a Bow", "Frozen", "Music", "Hung Up", and "4 Minutes".

Madonna has also recorded songs for film soundtracks, starting in 1985 with the release of "Crazy for You" and "Gambler", both of which she sang as a club singer cameo in the film Vision Quest (1985). She followed it with songs for her major film roles like Desperately Seeking Susan (1985) as well as Who's That Girl (1987). For the 1990 film Dick Tracy, Madonna collaborated with composer Stephen Sondheim to record solo music and duets with actors Warren Beatty and Mandy Patinkin. Madonna recorded her versions of musical numbers composed by Andrew Lloyd Webber and Tim Rice for the 1996 film Evita, along with actors Antonio Banderas and Jonathan Pryce. Her most recent song recorded for a film was "Masterpiece", for her directorial venture W.E.

Other musical endeavors from Madonna includes poems she recorded for albums, like "Bittersweet" by the Persian poet Rumi, read for contemporary spiritualist Deepak Chopra's album, A Gift Of Love: Music inspired by the Love Poems of Rumi (1998). She also recorded "If You Forget Me" by Pablo Neruda, for the soundtrack of the 1994 film, Il Postino: The Postman. Madonna's recorded music encompasses providing background vocals for other artists like Patrick Hernandez, John Benitez, Nick Kamen, Nick Scotti and Donna De Lory. She has collaborated with singers and musicians including Ricky Martin, Britney Spears, Annie Lennox, Nicki Minaj, M.I.A., Justin Timberlake and Timbaland.

Songs

See also
For all other songs that Madonna has performed live or used as samples / interludes during her concert tours, please check the below list:
 List of Madonna live performances

Sample credits and notes

References

External links
Madonna songs at AllMusic
BMI Repertoire Search Broadcast Music, Inc.

 
Madonna
Songs